The Story So Far is the third album by the Tewkesbury ska punk band Spunge. It was released on 26 August 2002 on the B-Unique Records label and recorded at two studios, Sawmills and Jacobs. The record was produced by John Cornfield (Supergrass, Muse) and Chris Sheldon (Foo Fighters, Therapy?).

The album perhaps marks a change in the band's sound, from a more laid-back ska style to a more rock sound. Two singles, "Jump on Demand" and "Roots", were released from the album..

The Story So Far includes a new version of the single "Ego", from Room For Abuse.

Track listing
 "The Story So Far" – 4:16
 "Roots" – 3:51
 "Give It A Try" – 2:34
 "Change of Scene" – 3:25
 "Skanking Song" – 2:23
 "Dotted Line" – 3:28
 "Ego" – 3:05
 "Jump on Demand" – 3:35
 "It's Over" – 2:41
 "Friend Called Fred" – 3:55
 "Too Little Too Late" – 3:59

2002 albums
Spunge albums
Albums produced by John Cornfield